Dhartiputra (English: Son of Earth) is a 1993 Hindi film, directed by Iqbal Durrani, and was the debut Bollywood film of Mammootty in the lead role. The film has Jaya Prada, Rishi Kapoor and Nagma in supporting roles. It was produced by Dinesh Patel, who earlier produced Phool aur Kaante and Divya Shakti, and the music was written by Nadeem-Shravan. The film was declared a semi hit at the box office and was the 24th highest-grossing film of 1993.

Plot 

The movie revolves around the fight between the dashing police officer Kapil Dev Singh and corrupted bureaucrats and politicians.

Cast 
Rishi Kapoor as Shiva
Mammootty as Kapil Dev Singh, Jailor
Jaya Pradha as Jeeva
Farah as Karma
Sujata Mehta as Gulab bai
Nagma as Lisa
Danny Denzongpa as Kripal Singh
Raza Murad as Yashpal Singh (guest appearance)
Suresh Oberoi as Governor (guest appearance)
Shoma Anand as Meena Bai
Shahbaz Khan (actor) as Anwar Khan
Shehzad Khan as Mahipal
Mac Mohan as Kripal Singh's Henchman.
Amrit Pal as Judge
Vikas Anand as Dr.Sharma

Soundtrack

References

External links 
 

1990s Hindi-language films
1993 films
Films scored by Nadeem–Shravan
Films set in prison
Indian films about revenge
Indian pregnancy films
Women in prison films
Indian action drama films
1993 action films
Hindi-language action films